Augustine FitzGerald (1765 – 4 December 1834) was an Irish politician.  He was a Member of Parliament (MP) for Clare from 1808 to 1818, and as MP for Ennis briefly in early 1832.

References 

1765 births
Year of birth uncertain
1834 deaths
Members of the Parliament of the United Kingdom for County Clare constituencies (1801–1922)
Baronets in the Baronetage of the United Kingdom
UK MPs 1807–1812
UK MPs 1812–1818
UK MPs 1831–1832